Lakewood is an unincorporated community located in Eddy County, New Mexico, United States. Lakewood has a post office with ZIP code 88254.

References

Unincorporated communities in Eddy County, New Mexico
Unincorporated communities in New Mexico